Crown Wallpaper, also known as the Crown Wallpaper Company, was an agglomeration of wallpaper manufacturers in the United Kingdom in 1899.

The Crown Wallpaper Archive, comprising 5,000 wallpaper samples and pattern books from the early 1950s to the late 1960s, is held at the Museum of Domestic Design and Architecture.

References

External links
Official website

Design companies of the United Kingdom
Wallpaper manufacturers